Australian Society of Magicians is an organisation for professional and amateur stage magicians, with approximately 1,000 members worldwide. The headquarters is in Sydney, Australia but it has branches all over the country. It is the oldest magical society in the Southern Hemisphere and the fourth-oldest in the world.

On January, 15 1909, the ASM started the publication of their official organ, The Magic Mirror, an eight page printed magazine. It was the first magic magazine in the Southern hemisphere.

See also

 Australian Institute of Magic

References

External links
 

1907 establishments in Australia
Clubs and societies in Australia
Magic clubs
Magic organizations
Organizations established in 1907
Performing arts in Australia